Samuel Dias Bandaranayake (1 December 1917 – 3 June 2014) was a Sri Lankan socialist politician and a member of parliament representing Gampaha.

Early life and education
Born to a wealthy family, his father was Conrad Peter Dias Bandaranayake, Muhandiram of the Guard and Siyane Korale and his mother was the daughter of Mudaliyar Ekanayake from Matara, his grandfather was Conrad (Peter) Petrus Dias Wijewardena Bandaranaike, Maha Mudaliyar. He was a cousin of S. W. R. D. Bandaranaike. He was educated at S. Thomas' College, Mount Lavinia, St. Thomas' College, Matara and studied agriculture at the University of Travancore. While in India he met figures such as Subhas Chandra Bose and Rabindranath Tagore. On his return he joined the newly formed Ceylon Agricultural Corps as a Commandant during World War II.

After the war he entered politics, campaigning for S. W. R. D. Bandaranaike and joined his newly formed Sri Lanka Freedom Party. He was elected to parliament in 1952 general election from the Gampaha electorate, however he did not accept the office due to disagreements with S. W. R. D. Bandaranaike on the Sinhala Only Act. However, he was instrumental in stopping J. R. Jayewardene's march to Kandy in protest of the Bandaranaike–Chelvanayakam Pact. He was re-elected in the next four elections in 1956, 1960 March, 1960 July and 1965. He lost his seat to A. T. Basnayake of the Sri Lanka Freedom Party, having contested the 1970 general election as an independent.  

He was involved in the 1971 JVP Insurrection against the SLFP led government under Sirimavo Bandaranaike. The Criminal Justice Commission which was set up to prosecute insurgents found him guilty of two counts of being a member of the JVP and attending the five lectures. He was given a suspended sentence of two years. In 1977, he was reelected in the 1977 general election from the Sri Lanka Freedom Party.

Family
His son, Pandu, is one of the sitting members of parliament for Gampaha (1994-present).

See also
List of political families in Sri Lanka
Bandaranaike family

References

Members of the 2nd Parliament of Ceylon
Members of the 3rd Parliament of Ceylon
Members of the 4th Parliament of Ceylon
Members of the 5th Parliament of Ceylon
Members of the 6th Parliament of Ceylon
Members of the 8th Parliament of Sri Lanka
Members of the 9th Parliament of Sri Lanka
Sri Lanka Freedom Party politicians
Janatha Vimukthi Peramuna members
Alumni of S. Thomas' College, Mount Lavinia
SD
Prisoners and detainees of Sri Lanka
Sri Lankan prisoners and detainees
Sri Lankan politicians convicted of crimes
1917 births
2014 deaths